Atlantic County is a county located along the Jersey Shore in the U.S. state of New Jersey. As of the 2020 census, the county was the state's 15th-most-populous county, with a population of 274,534, a drop of 15 from the 2010 census count of 274,549. Its county seat is the Mays Landing section of Hamilton Township. The county is part of the South Jersey region of the state.

The most populous place in Atlantic County was Egg Harbor Township, with 47,842 residents at the time of the 2020 census; Galloway Township, covered , the largest total area of any municipality, though Hamilton Township has the largest land area, covering . Atlantic County forms the Atlantic City–Hammonton metropolitan statistical area, which is also part of the Delaware Valley combined statistical area.

History

Etymology
The county was named after the Atlantic Ocean, which borders the county's eastern coast.

History
Since the 6th millennium BC, Native American people have inhabited New Jersey. By the 17th century, the Absegami tribe of the Unalachtigo Lenape tribe – "people near the ocean" – stayed along the streams and back bays of what is now Atlantic County. The group referred to the broader area as Scheyichbi – "land bordering the ocean". European settlement by the Dutch, Sweden, and England contributed to the demise of the indigenous people. In 1674, West Jersey was established, and its provincial government designated the court of Burlington County in 1681, splitting off Gloucester County five years later from the southern portion. This county was bounded by the Mullica River to the north, the Atlantic Ocean to the east, and the Great Egg Harbor River and Tuckahoe River to the south. Great Egg Harbour Township, also called New Weymouth and later just Egg Harbor, was designated in 1693 from the eastern portions of Gloucester County.

The region's early Europeansettlers, many of them Quakers, lived along the area's waterways. In 1695, John Somers purchased  of land on the northern shore of the Great Egg Harbor Bay in 1695, the same year he began ferry service across the bay to Cape May County. His son, Richard, built Somers Mansion between 1720 and 1726, which is the oldest home in existence in the county. Daniel Leeds first surveyed the coastal waters of Egg Harbor in 1698, eventually finding Leeds Point. In 1735 according to folklore, Mother Leeds gave birth and cursed her 13th child in Leeds Point, which became known as the Jersey Devil. In the early 18th century, George May founded Mays Landing.

In 1774, the northern portion of Egg Harbor Township became Galloway Township. In 1785, residents in what is now Atlantic County requested to split from Gloucester County to the New Jersey legislature, wanting a local court. Mays Landing – the region's largest community at the time, had more saloons than churches. Criminals could escape custody before reaching Gloucester City on a four-day wagon ride. In 1798, the western portion split off to become Weymouth Township, and in 1813, the northwestern portion partitioned to become Hamilton Township. On February 7, 1837, the New Jersey legislature designated Atlantic County from Galloway, Hamilton, Weymouth, and Egg Harbor townships, choosing Mays Landing as the county seat. In the same year, the Board of Freeholders was established as the county government. As of the 1830 census, the townships making up Atlantic County only had a population of 8,164, making it the least populated New Jersey county. By that time, a continuous line of houses extended from Somers Point to Absecon.

Mullica Township was established from Galloway Township in 1837. In 1852, Dr. Jonathan Pitney recommended Absecon Island as a health resort, and formed the Camden and Atlantic Railroad Company to construct the line from Camden to the coast. The company purchased land from Atlantic and Galloway Townships in 1853, then promoted and sold the lots. Atlantic City formed on May 1, 1854, in advance of the rail line opening on July 4 of that year. In 1858, Egg Harbor City was formed from portions of Galloway and Mullica townships. In 1866, Hammonton was founded from Hamilton and Mullica townships. A year later, portions of Hamilton Township split off to become Buena Vista Township. In 1872, Absecon was split from portions of Egg Harbor and Galloway townships. By 1885, more than half of the county's population lived in Atlantic City, and by 1910 this more than two-thirds of the county lived there.

With more people moving to the area in the late 1800s into the early 1900s, several municipalities were created in short succession – Margate City (then called South Atlantic City) in 1885, Somers Point in 1886, Pleasantville and Linwood in 1889, Brigantine in 1890, Longport in 1898, Ventnor in 1903, Northfield and Port Republic in 1905, and Folsom in 1906. On May 17, 1906, the eastern coastal boundary of Atlantic County was established. The final municipalities in the county to be created were Corbin City from Weymouth Township in 1922, Estell Manor from Weymouth Township in 1925, and Buena from Buena Township in 1948. In 1938, the county's western border was clarified with Camden and Burlington counties using geographic coordinates. After a peak in prominence in the 1920s during the prohibition era, Atlantic City began declining in population in the 1950s as tourism declined. The county's growth shifted to the mainland.

In 1973, the New Jersey Coastal Area Facilities Review Act required additional state permitting for construction in the eastern half of the county. In the same ballot as the 1976 presidential election, 56.8% of New Jersey voters approved an initiative to allow legalized gambling in Atlantic City. Two years later, Resorts Atlantic City opened as the first casino in the city, and there were 15 by 1990. Since then, five have closed, including four in 2014, while two casinos – the Borgata and Ocean Resort Casino – have opened. Hard Rock Hotel & Casino Atlantic City opened in 2018, refurbishing the former Trump Taj Mahal. In 1978, Congress created the Pinelands National Reserve, which created the Pinelands Commission and a management policy for the seven counties in the Pine Barrens, including Atlantic County. Concurrent with the 1980 Presidential election, Atlantic County residents voted in favor to create a new state of South Jersey, along with five other counties in a nonbinding referendum.

Geography
It is the third largest county in New Jersey, behind Ocean County and Burlington County.

The county lies along the Atlantic Coastal Plain, with sea level and the Atlantic Ocean to the east. Adjacent to the coast are three barrier islands – Absecon Island (Which contains Atlantic City, Ventnor, Margate, and Longport), Brigantine Island, and Little Beach. To the west of the barrier islands, 4 mi (6 km) stretch of marshlands, inlets, and waterways connect and form the Intracoastal Waterway. Beneath the county is a mile of clay and sand that contains the Kirkwood–Cohansey aquifer, which supplies fresh groundwater for all of the streams and rivers in the region. The interior of the county is part of the Pine Barrens, which covers the southern third of New Jersey, and is prone to forest fires. Lowland areas are swampy and contain pitch pine or white cedar trees. Upland areas in the west of the county are hilly, containing oak and pine trees. The county's western boundary with Burlington and Camden counties, clarified in 1761, is a manmade line about halfway between the Atlantic Ocean and the Delaware Bay.

Climate

The county has a humid subtropical climate (Cfa).

Three people died in the county during the storm, and damage was estimated at $300 million (2012 USD).

Demographics

2020 Census

2010 Census

Government

County government
In 1974, Atlantic County voters changed the county governmental form under the Optional County Charter Law to the County executive form. Atlantic County joins Bergen, Essex, Hudson and Mercer counties as one of the five of 21 New Jersey counties with an elected executive. The charter provides for a directly elected executive and a nine-member Board of County Commissioners, responsible for legislation. The executive is elected to a four-year term and the freeholders are elected to staggered three-year terms, of which four are elected from the county on an at-large basis and five of the freeholders represent equally populated districts. In 2016, freeholders were paid $20,000 a year, while the freeholder chairman was paid an annual salary of $21,500.

, Atlantic County's Executive is Republican Dennis Levinson, whose four-year term of office ends December 31, 2023. Members of the Board of County Commissioners are (with terms for chair and vice-chair ending December 31):

Pursuant to Article VII Section II of the New Jersey State Constitution, each county in New Jersey is required to have three elected administrative officials known as "constitutional officers."  These officers are the County Clerk and County Surrogate (both elected for five-year terms of office) and the County Sheriff (elected for a three-year term). Atlantic County's constitutional officers are:

The Atlantic County Prosecutor is William E. Reynolds of Absecon, New Jersey, who took office in June 2022 after being nominated the previous month on May 16, 2022 by Governor of New Jersey Phil Murphy and receiving confirmation on August 8, 2022 from the New Jersey Senate. Atlantic County, along with Cape May County, is part of Vicinage 1 of New Jersey Superior Court. The Atlantic County Civil Courthouse Complex is in Atlantic City, while criminal cases are heard in May's Landing; the Assignment Judge for Vicinage 1 is Michael Blee A.J.S.C.

Federal representatives 
The 2nd Congressional District covers all of Atlantic County.

State representatives

Politics 
In national elections, Atlantic County leans Democratic, in contrast to the other three counties on the Jersey Shore–Monmouth, Ocean, and Cape May counties–which tend to lean heavily Republican. It has not voted for a Republican presidential candidate since George H. W. Bush in 1988. However, it is considered a swing county in down-ballot races, and Republicans hold all of its seats in the state legislature. As of October 1, 2021, there were a total of 209,135 registered voters in Atlantic County, of whom 74,565 (35.7%) were registered as Democrats, 57,223 (27.4%) were registered as Republicans and 74,404 (35.6%) were registered as unaffiliated. There were 2,943 (1.4%) voters registered to other parties. Among the county's 2010 Census population, 62.5% were registered to vote, including 76.7% of those ages 18 and over.

In the 2020 presidential election, Democrat Joe Biden received 73,808 votes (52.7%) in the county, ahead of Republican Donald Trump with 64,438 (46.0%). In the 2016 presidential election, Democrat Hillary Clinton received 60,924 votes (51.0%) in the county, ahead of Republican Donald Trump with 52,690 votes (44.1%), and other candidates with 3,677 (3.1%). In the 2012 presidential election, Democrat Barack Obama received 65,600 votes (57.9%) in the county, ahead of Republican Mitt Romney with 46,522 votes (41.1%) and other candidates with 1,057 votes (0.9%), among the 113,231 ballots cast by the county's 172,204 registered voters, for a turnout of 65.8%. In the 2008 presidential election, Democrat Barack Obama received 67,830 votes (56.5%) in Atlantic County, ahead of Republican John McCain with 49,902 votes (41.6%) and other candidates with 1,310 votes (1.1%), among the 120,074 ballots cast by the county's 176,316 registered voters, for a turnout of 68.1%. 

|}

In the 2009 gubernatorial election, Republican Chris Christie received 35,724 votes (47.7%), ahead of Democrat Jon Corzine with 33,361 votes (44.5%), Independent Chris Daggett with 3,611 votes (4.8%) and other candidates with 913 votes (1.2%), among the 74,915 ballots cast by the county's 166,958 registered voters, yielding a 44.9% turnout. In the 2013 gubernatorial election, Republican Chris Christie received 43,975 votes in the county (60.0%), ahead of Democrat Barbara Buono with 25,557 votes (34.9%) and other candidates with 947 votes (1.3%), among the 73,258 ballots cast by the county's 176,696 registered voters, yielding a 41.5% turnout. In the 2017 gubernatorial election, Republican Kim Guadagno received 28,456 (42.5%) of the vote, and Democrat Phil Murphy received 36,952 (55.1%) of the vote. In the 2021 gubernatorial election, Republican Jack Ciattarelli received 55.3% of the vote (44,977 ballots cast) to Democrat Phil Murphy's 44.0% (35,736 votes), making it one of the three counties that Ciattarelli flipped Republican.

Economy

Based on data from the Bureau of Economic Analysis, Atlantic County had a gross domestic product (GDP) of $12.9 billion in 2018, which was ranked 15th in the state and represented an increase of 3.5% from the previous year.

When Atlantic County was first established in 1837, its sparse population subsided on clams, oysters, and fishing. An early industry was shipbuilding, using the sturdy oak trees of the Pine Barrens. Bog iron furnaces opened in the early 1800s, but declined by the 1850s due to the growth of the Philadelphia iron industry. Around this time, several people and cotton mills opened. The first railroad across the county opened in 1854, intended to assist the bog iron industry; instead, it spurred development in Atlantic City, as well as the growth of farming towns. Farmers began growing grapes, cranberries, and blueberries. The competition dropped the price of travel to 50¢, affordable for Philadelphia's working class. Travelers often brought their lunch in shoe boxes, leading to their nickname "shoobies".

Legalized gambling and the growth of the casino industry employed more than 34,145 people as of 2012.

Breweries, distilleries, and wineries
In 1864, Louis Nicholas Renault brought property in Egg Harbor City and opened Renault Winery, the oldest active winery in New Jersey, and third-oldest in the United States. During the prohibition era, the winery obtained a government permit to sell wine tonic for medicinal purposes. Tomasello Winery grew its first vineyard in 1888, and opened to the public in 1933. Gross Highland Winery operated in Absecon from 1934 to 1987, when it was sold to developers. Balic Winery opened in 1966 in Mays Landing, although its vineyards date back to the early 19th century. Sylvin Farms Winery opened in 1985 in Egg Harbor City. In 2001, Bellview Winery opened in the Landisville section of Buena. A year later, DiMatteo Vineyards opened in Hammonton, and in 2007, Plagido's Winery opened in the same town.

In 1998, Tun Tavern Brewery opened in Atlantic City across from the Atlantic City Convention Center, named after the original Tun Tavern in Philadelphia, which was the oldest brew house in the country, opening in 1685. In 2015, Tuckahoe Brewing moved from Ocean View to a facility in Egg Harbor Township capable of producing four times the amount of beer. Garden State Beer Company opened in 2016 in Galloway. In 2018, Hidden Sands Brewery opened in Egg Harbor Township.

In 2014, Lazy Eye Distillery opened in Richland in Buena Vista Township. Little Water Distillery opened in Atlantic City in 2016.

Municipalities

The 23 municipalities in Atlantic County (with 2010 Census data for population, housing units and area) are:

Education
Institutions of higher education in Atlantic County include:
 Atlantic Cape Community College in Mays Landing serves students from both Atlantic and Cape May counties, having been created in 1964 as the state's second county college. Rutgers University offers an off-site program at Atlantic Cape Community College that allows students with an associate degree from an accredited college to earn a bachelor's degree from Rutgers.
 Stockton University, in Galloway Township, was established to provide a four-year college serving the South Jersey area.

School districts include:

 Absecon City School District (listed as K-12, but only has K-8)
 Atlantic City School District
 Brigantine City School District (listed as K-12, but only has K-8)
 Buena Regional School District
 Corbin City School District (non-operating school district)
 Egg Harbor Township School District
 Estell Manor City School District (listed as K-12, but only has K-8)
 Folsom Borough School District (listed as K-12, but only has K-8)
 Hammonton Town School District
 Longport Borough School District (non-operating school district)
 Margate City School District (listed as K-12, but only has K-8)
 Pleasantville City School District
 Port Republic City School District (listed as K-12, but only has K-8)
 Ventnor City School District (listed as K-12, but only has K-8)
 Weymouth Township School District (listed as K-12, but only has K-8)

Secondary:
 Greater Egg Harbor Regional School District
 Mainland Regional School District

Elementary:

 Egg Harbor City School District
 Galloway Township School District
 Hamilton Township School District
 Linwood City School District
 Mullica Township School District
 Northfield City School District
 Somers Point City School District

Health and police services
AtlantiCare is the largest non-casino employer, with a staff of over 5,500 people over five counties, established in 1993 by the Atlantic City Medical Center Board of Governors. Atlantic City Hospital opened in 1898, becoming Atlantic City Medical Center in 1973. Two years later, the hospital built its Mainland Division in Pomona. AtlantiCare has also opened four urgent care centers. In 1928, Dr. Charles Ernst and Dr. Frank Inksetter built Atlantic Shores Hospital and Sanitarium in Somers Point as a private institute for the treatment of alcohol and drug dependency. In 1940, citizens turned the facility into the not-for-profit Shore Medical Center, which has expanded over time to add more beds and units.

In 1840, the first county jail opened in Mays Landing, designed by Thomas Ustick Walter, who also designed the U.S. Capital building. This facility was replaced by newer facilities in 1932, 1962, and the current Gerard L. Gormley Justice Facility in 1985, which can hold 1,000 inmates. The facility has controlled by the Atlantic County Department of Public Safety since 1987.

Parks and recreation
The nearest YMCA is the Cumberland Cape Atlantic YMCA in Vineland.

National protected areas
 Great Egg Harbor Scenic and Recreational River runs from Camden County to Great Egg Harbor.

Transportation

The indigenous people of New Jersey developed a series of trails across the state, including one from current-day Absecon to Camden. Early transportation relied on the region's waterways. An early coastal road was constructed in 1716 from Somers Point to Nacote Creek in Port Republic. Roads into the county's interior were slow, unreliable, and muddy, with one main roadway along the Mullica River that eventually connected to Burlington. Roads later connected the region's industries in the 19th century, until the county's first railroad opened in 1854, which brought more people to the region. By 1870, the Camden and Atlantic Railroad Company carried 417,000 people each year. Also in that year, the Pleasantville and Atlantic Turnpike opened, crossing Beach Thorofare into Atlantic City. A railroad competitor, the Philadelphia and Atlantic City Railway, opened in 1877 after only 90 days of construction. Other rail lines connected farms and cities throughout the county by the end of the 19th century. Improved roads reduced the reliance on railroads by the 1950s.

In the late 1800s, a bridge opened in Mays Landing, providing road access to the county's interior. The first car in Atlantic City was seen in 1899. By the 1890s, visitors began riding bicycles in the coastal resort towns, and thousands of people would ride from Camden to the coast on weekends. Amid pressure from motorists and cyclists, the county improved the conditions of the roads in the early 20th century. The first road bridge to Atlantic City opened in 1905, using Albany Avenue on what is now US 40/322. In 1916, the causeway that is now New Jersey Route 152 opened between Somers Point and Longport. In 1919, the White Horse Pike (US 30) was completed from Atlantic City to Camden, and repaved through the county in 1925. Also in 1922, the Harding Highway (US 40) opened from Pennsville Township to Atlantic City, named after then-President Warren G. Harding. In 1928, the Beesley's Point Bridge opened, replacing the ferry between Somers Point and Cape May County. The Black Horse Pike (US 322) opened in 1935, connecting Atlantic City to Camden. Most of the county's older bridges were replaced over time; formerly the oldest still in existence was a swing bridge from 1904 that crosses Nacote Creek in Port Republic, but work on that bridge's replacement began in summer of 2021. The Great Egg Harbor Bridge opened in 1956, marking the completion of the Garden State Parkway, which connected Cape May and Atlantic counties, continuing to North Jersey. In 1964, the Atlantic City Expressway opened between the Parkway and Camden County, and a year later was extended into Atlantic City. In 2001, the Atlantic City–Brigantine Connector was built, connecting the Expressway with Atlantic City's marina district.

As early as 1990, the South Jersey Transportation Authority had plans to construct an Atlantic County Beltway as a limited-access road, beginning along Ocean Heights Avenue in southern Egg Harbor Township at a proposed Exit 32 with the Garden State Parkway. The proposed road would pass west of the Atlantic City Airport and reconnect with the Parkway at Exit 44 via County Route 575 in Galloway Township. The routing was later truncated from U.S. 40 (the Black Horse Pike) to Exit 44 on the Parkway. The project was considered "desirable" but was not funded.

Roads and highways

Major highways

Public transportation
NJ Transit's Atlantic City Line connects the Atlantic City Rail Terminal in Atlantic City with the 30th Street Station in Philadelphia, with service at intermediate stations at Hammonton, Egg Harbor City and Absecon in the county.

See also

 National Register of Historic Places listings in Atlantic County, New Jersey

Notes

References

External links
 Atlantic County website
 History of Atlantic County, New Jersey

 
1837 establishments in New Jersey
Geography of the Pine Barrens (New Jersey)
Jersey Shore
Populated places established in 1837
South Jersey